Iproca aoyamaorum is a species of beetle in the family Cerambycidae. It was described by Hasegawa and Ohbayashi in 2006.

References

Apomecynini
Beetles described in 2006